Madol Duwa (Sinhala, Mangrove Island) is a 1976 Sri Lankan drama film directed by Lester James Peries and produced by Upasena Marasinghe. The film stars Ajith Jinadasa as Upali, a young rebellious youth who travels to a small island to get away from the restrictive society around him.

The film is based on Martin Wickremasinghe's 1947 novel Madol Doova. It was a commercial success.

Plot
Young Upali Giniwella (Nandana Hettiarachi who grows up into Ajith Jinadasa) is resentful of his new stepmother (Somalatha Subasinghe) and lashes out by committing harmless acts of mischief around the village. For this Upali is sent to a boarding school where he bonds with the headmaster (Joe Abeywickrema). He once again gets into trouble however and is returned home when a new headmaster installed.

Upali is punished by his father back home. He becomes more resentful and takes off with his servant boy Jinna (Padmasena Athukorala) to the island dubbed Madol Duwa. After some adventures there, Upali is found by a friend of his father. Upali learns that his father is sick and returns home to ask for forgiveness.

Cast
 Ajith Jinadasa as Upali Giniwelle
 Padmasena Athukorala as Jinadasa 'Jinna'
 David Dharmakeerthi as Mudalali 'Thaththa'
 Somalatha Subasinghe as Upali's stepmother
 S. A. Jamis as Podi Gamarala
 Joe Abeywickrama as Dharmasinghe 'Gurunnanse'
 Daya Alwis as Punchi Mahaththaya
 Trilicia Gunawardena as Dharmasinghe 'Hamine'
 Mapa Gunaratne as Lawyer Rajapakse
 Damayanthi Fonseka as Lawyer's daughter
 Nandana Hettiarachchi as Young Upali
 Sunil Premakumara as Dangadasa
 Upali Attanayake as Suranchiya
 Dhamma Jagoda as Balappu
 Pujitha Mendis as Upasaka Appu
 Denawaka Hamine as Net trapped homeowner
 Shanthi Lekha as Annie Perera
 Somaratne Dissanayake as Raja Niladariya
 Senaka Perera as Suranchiya's friend
 Harry Wimalasena as Stage fleeing actor
 Rinsley Weeraratne as Fisherman
 Miyuri Samarasinghe as Upali's mother

Soundtrack
The song Koheda Koheda Ape Lowak sung by Victor Rathnayake is included in this film.

See also
 Madol Doova
 Martin Wickramasinghe

References

1976 films
Films directed by Lester James Peries
Films based on works by Martin Wickramasinghe
Films based on Sri Lankan novels